Proterodiplostomidae is a monotypic family of trematodes in the order Diplostomida. It consists of one subfamily, Polycotylinae Monticelli, 1888, which consists of one genus, Cheloniodiplostomum Sudarikov, 1960, which consists of four species: Cheloniodiplostomum argentinense Palumbo & Diaz, 2018; Cheloniodiplostomum breve (MacCallum, 1921); Cheloniodiplostomum delillei (Zerecero, 1947); and Cheloniodiplostomum testudinis (Dubois, 1936).

References

Diplostomida
Trematode families